Phalonidia decrepita is a species of moth of the family Tortricidae. It is found in Goiás, Brazil.

The wingspan is about 11.5 mm. The ground colour of the forewings is white, sprinkled and strigulated (finely streaked) with brownish grey. The base, median area and terminal part of the wing are brownish grey. The hindwings are pale brownish creamy.

References

Moths described in 2002
Phalonidia